Army of God may refer to:

Christianity 

In worldview and social life:
The biblical heavenly host
 Militia Christi of Western, Roman Catholic world
 Army of God (terrorist organization), a Christian anti-abortion organization in the United States

In art and literature:
 Army of God, which fought against King John in the First Barons' War, led by the "Marshal of the Army of God" Robert Fitzwalter
 Army of God (Bonekickers), an episode of the BBC archaeology drama, Bonekickers

Islam 
 Jundallah (Iran), Arabic for "The Army of Allah", a terrorist Sunni (sic) Muslim Islamist organization
 Jundallah (Pakistan), as above but with separate leadership and orientation

Judaism 
 Tzivos Hashem, Hebrew (with Ashkenazi pronunciation) for "Army of God", a youth group created by the Chabad Lubavitch movement

See also 
 God's Army (disambiguation)